Behrouz Souresrafil (12 February 1951 – 9 November 2022) was an Iranian journalist. Before the revolution, he was working as an editor-in-chief of Ayandegan and various magazines. Like many other journalists, he immigrated to France after the revolution and published a newspaper titled Iran o Jahan (Iran and the World). He was also for some time the editor-in-chief of the newspaper Kayhan London. He immigrated to the United States in 1998.

Souresrafil was the editor-in-chief of the Shabahang program at VOA-PNN. He was a royalist and a secularist.

Souresrafil died on 9 November 2022, at the age of 71.

References

1951 births
2022 deaths
People from Tehran
Iranian journalists
Criticism of journalism